Stranded in the Arcady was a popular book by Francis Lynde (1856–1930) first published in 1917. It was adapted to a silent film Stranded in Arcady by  Astra Film.

The book was illustrated by Arthur E. Becher. Several of Lynde's other books were also adapted into films.

The film was directed by Frank Hall Crane and starred Irene Castle, Elliott Dexter, George Majeroni, and Pell Trenton. The story is set in the Canadian wilderness.

References

1917 books